Alexandra Fusai and Kerry-Anne Guse were the defending champions but only Guse competed that year with Rika Hiraki.

Guse and Hiraki won in the final 6–1, 7–6 against Maureen Drake and Renata Kolbovic.

Seeds
Champion seeds are indicated in bold text while text in italics indicates the round in which those seeds were eliminated.

 Rachel McQuillan /  Nana Miyagi (first round)
 Kerry-Anne Guse /  Rika Hiraki (champions)
 Sung-Hee Park /  Shi-Ting Wang (quarterfinals)
 Henrieta Nagyová /  Dominique Van Roost (first round)

Draw

External links
 1997 Wismilak International Doubles Draw

Commonwealth Bank Tennis Classic
1997 WTA Tour